is a Japanese right-handed pitcher. He played in the 2006 World Baseball Classic for Japan.

As a relief pitcher Kobayashi throws a fastball that sits in 87-91 mph (tops out at 93 mph), silder, change-up, and an effective forkball as his out pitch.

External links

Hiroyuki Kobayashi, JapaneseBallPlayers.com

1978 births
2006 World Baseball Classic players
Chiba Lotte Marines players
Hanshin Tigers players
Japanese baseball players
Living people
Nippon Professional Baseball pitchers
People from Sōka
Saitama Seibu Lions players
Baseball people from Saitama Prefecture